La Liga Del Sueño is a Peruvian pop punk band formed in 1991 which had two minor hits "La Peor de las Guerras" and "Mala Sangre".

The band was formed in Lima by several members of the very well known (locally) clown troupé called "Pataclaun" including Jorge "Pelo" Madueño, Gonzalo Torres and Johanna San Miguel.

Their first public performance was on October 31, 1991 in "Centro Cultural Parra del Riego" (Barranco, Lima) along with established local musician Miki González.

History

In 1994 the band released their first album Al derecho y al revés including "Aldina" which had brief rotation on MTV Latino. 
Two years later Por Tierra ("By land") under the label "Discos Independientes", including the original version of their first - though minor - hit "La Peor de las Guerras" ("The worst of all wars"). Local success ensued and the band was signed by Sony Music in 1998. With Sony they released Mundo Cachina which had wide rotation in Peruvian media helped by the music videos for "Mala Sangre" and "No es amor".

In 1999 the band was invited to Sony International's A&R Convention where bands like La Oreja de Van Gogh and Creed, also played.

After heavy touring the band went into hiatus in 2000, however in 2007 founding member "Pelo" Madueño announced the band would be playing together again.

Discography
Al derecho y Al revés (1994)
Por Tierra (Discos Independientes, 1996)
Mundo Cachina (Sony Latino, 2000)

Peruvian musical groups
Musical groups established in 1991
1991 establishments in Peru